Mustavuori (Finnish), Svarta backen (Swedish) is a subdivision of Vuosaari, an eastern neighbourhood of Helsinki, Finland.

References 

Vuosaari